Szepietowo  is a town in Wysokie Mazowieckie County, Podlaskie Voivodeship, in north-eastern Poland. It is the seat of the gmina (administrative district) called Gmina Szepietowo.

Szepietowo has a population of 2,412. It gained town status on 1 January 2010.

References

Szepietowo
Wysokie Mazowieckie County
Podlachian Voivodeship
Łomża Governorate
Białystok Voivodeship (1919–1939)
Belastok Region